Marcos Daniel was the defending champion, but lost to Ricardo Hocevar 6–7(3–7), 1–6 in the first round. José Acasuso defeated Marcelo Demoliner 6–2, 6–2 in the final.

Seeds

Draw

Finals

Top half

Bottom half

References
Main Draw
Qualifying Singles

Aberto Santa Catarina de Tenis - Singles
2011 Singles